Wang Xiaohui (born August 1962) is a Chinese politician who is the current party secretary of Sichuan, in office since April 2022. Previously he served as director of the National Film Administration and deputy head of the Propaganda Department of the Chinese Communist Party. He is a representative of the 19th National Congress of the Chinese Communist Party and a member of the 19th Central Committee of the Chinese Communist Party.

Biography
Wang was born in Changling County, Jilin, in 1962. He earned his master's degree in law from Jilin University.

After university in 1986, he was assigned to the Propaganda Department of the Chinese Communist Party, where he was eventually promoted to deputy head in 2009. He concurrently served as director of the  since May 2018.

In April 2022, he was transferred to southwest China's Sichuan province and appointed party secretary, the top political position in the province.

References

1962 births
Living people
People from Changling County
Jilin University alumni
People's Republic of China politicians from Jilin
Chinese Communist Party politicians from Jilin
Members of the 19th Central Committee of the Chinese Communist Party